César Córdoba (born 23 October 1980) is a Spanish professional kickboxer and boxer, two times WKN World Champion.

Titles

Kickboxing
2011 WKL K-1 Rules World Champion
2010 WKN Oriental Rules Super Light Heavyweight World Champion -85.5 kg.
2005 WKN Oriental Rules Super Middleweight World Champion -79,4 kg.
Spanish Kickboxing Champion

Boxing
2014 Spanish Cruiserweight Champion
2008 BOXAM Champion

Kickboxing record

|-
|-  bgcolor="#CCFFCC" 
| 2015-02-07 || Win ||align=left| Frank Muñoz || International Fighting Championship 2|| Barcelona, Spain || Decision (Unanimous) || 3 || 3:00
|-
|-  bgcolor="#CCFFCC" 
| 2014-07-25 || Win ||align=left| Melvin Manhoef || International Fighting Championship || Badalona, Spain || TKO (Referee Stoppage) || 1 || 2:59
|-
|-  bgcolor="#c5d2ea"
| 2013-03-09 || Draw ||align=left| Sahak Parparyan || Enfusion Live: Barcelona || Barcelona, Spain || Decision draw || 3 || 3:00
|-
|-  bgcolor="#CCFFCC" 
| 2011-11-19 || Win ||align=left| Fred Sikking || King Of Warriors || Barcelona, Spain || KO || 1 ||
|-
! style=background:white colspan=9 |
|-
|-  bgcolor="#CCFFCC"
| 2011-07-03 || Win ||align=left| Pruden Cabrera || Fight 4 Life || Barcelona, Spain || Decision || 3 || 3:00
|-
|-  bgcolor=#c5d2ea
| 2010-12-12 || Draw ||align=left| Lorenzo Javier Jorge  ||  || Santa Cruz de Tenerife, Spain || Decision (Draw) || 3 || 3:00
|-
|-  bgcolor="#CCFFCC" 
| 2010-10-23 || Win ||align=left| Bruno Brendan || Fight 4 Life || Barcelona, Spain || KO || 1 ||
|-
! style=background:white colspan=9 |
|-
|-  bgcolor="#CCFFCC" 
| 2010-03-27 || Win ||align=left| Said El Bouanani || Fight 4 Life|| Barcelona, Spain || Decision || 5 ||  3:00
|-
|-  bgcolor="#CCFFCC" 
| 2009-11-28 || Win ||align=left| Ibrahim Lopez ||  || Tenerife, Spain || KO || 2 ||
|-
|-  bgcolor="#FFBBBB" 
| 2006-05-06 || Loss ||align=left| Sidy Kone || Champions League Kick Boxing || Santa Cruz de Tenerife, Canary Islands || KO (Injury) || 2 ||
|-
|-  bgcolor="#CCFFCC" 
| 2005-03-07 || Win ||align=left| Aurélien Duarte || ||  || Decision || 5 ||  3:00
|-
! style=background:white colspan=9 |
|-
|-  bgcolor="#CCFFCC"
| 2004-12-11 || Win ||align=left| Roberto Cocco || Superliga 2004 Federacion Catalana || Barcelona, Spain || Decision || 5 || 3:00
|-
|-  bgcolor="#CCFFCC"
| 2003-12-20 || Win ||align=left| Walid Haddad || K-1 Spain Grand Prix 2003 in Barcelona || Barcelona, Spain  || KO ||  || 
|-
|-
| colspan=9 | Legend:

Boxing record

|-
|align="center" colspan=8|11 Wins (9 knockouts, 2 decisions), 2 Losses, 0 Draws 
|-
|align=center style="border-style: none none solid solid; background: #e3e3e3"|Res.
|align=center style="border-style: none none solid solid; background: #e3e3e3"|Record
|align=center style="border-style: none none solid solid; background: #e3e3e3"|Opponent
|align=center style="border-style: none none solid solid; background: #e3e3e3"|Type
|align=center style="border-style: none none solid solid; background: #e3e3e3"|Rd., Time
|align=center style="border-style: none none solid solid; background: #e3e3e3"|Date
|align=center style="border-style: none none solid solid; background: #e3e3e3"|Location
|align=center style="border-style: none none solid solid; background: #e3e3e3"|Notes
|-align=center
|Loss
|11–2
|align=left| Ricards Bolotniks
| TKO || 1 
|2016-11-12 || align=left| Bilbao Exhibition Centre, Baracaldo, País Vasco
|align=left|
|-align=center
|Win
|11–1
|align=left| Sylvain Luce
| PTS || 6
|2016-05-14 || align=left| Pabellón de la Vall d'Hebron, Barcelona, Cataluña
|
|-align=center
|Win
|10–1
|align=left|  Giorgi Tevdorashvili 
| TKO || 4 
|2016-02-13 || align=left| Pabellón de la Vall d'Hebron, Barcelona, Cataluña
|
|-align=center
|Loss
|9–1
|align=left|  Sylvera Louis
| TKO || 7 
|2015-10-24 || align=left| Pabellón de la Vall d'Hebron, Barcelona, Cataluña
|
|-align=center
|Win
|9–0
|align=left|  Arturs Kulikauskis
| TKO || 4 
|2015-07-10 || align=left| Torrequebrada Hotel & Casino, Benalmadena, Andalucía
|
|-align=center
|Win
|8–0
|align=left|  Gogita Gorgiladze 
| TKO || 2 
|2014-05-16 || align=left| Palacio de los Deportes, San Pedro de Alcántara, Andalucía
|
|-align=center
|Win
|7–0
|align=left| Ibrahim Lopez
| TKO || 5 
|2014-11-01 || align=left| Pabellon Pancho Camurria, Santa Cruz de Tenerife, Islas Canarias
|
|-align=center
|Win
|6–0
|align=left| Julien Guibaud Ribaud
| TKO || 1 
|2014-05-10 || align=left| Pabellon Sferic, Tarrasa, Catalonia
|
|-align=center
|Win
|5–0
|align=left| Carlos Caicedo
| KO || 1 
|2014-02-15 || align=left| Pabellon Sferic, Tarrasa, Catalonia
|
|-align=center
|Win
|4–0
|align=left| Alvaro Terrero
| TKO || 3 
|2013-02-02 || align=left| Tarrasa, Catalonia
|
|-align=center
|Win
|3–0
|align=left|  Merdjidin Yuseinov 
| TKO || 3 
|2012-04-14 || align=left| Barcelona, Catalonia
|
|-align=center
|Win
|2–0
|align=left| Nuno Lagarto
| TKO || 3 
|2011-10-15 || align=left| Barcelona, Catalonia
|
|-align=center
|Win
|1–0
|align=left| Prudencio Cabrera
| PTS || 4 
|2011-07-03 || align=left| Sant Adria del Besos, Catalonia
|align=left|

See also
List of male kickboxers

References 

1980 births
Living people
Sportspeople from Barcelona
Spanish male kickboxers
Spanish Muay Thai practitioners
Spanish male boxers
Cruiserweight boxers